Rio is an album by jazz guitarist Lee Ritenour recorded in New York City, Santa Barbara, and Rio de Janeiro, originally titled Lee Ritenour In Rio. It was released in 1979 in Japan on JVC Records, then in 1982 in the U.S. on Elektra/Musician Records, then on GRP in 1985 with a different album cover and track sequence.

Track listing
All titles composed by Lee Ritenour except where noted
"Rio Funk" – 5:10
"San Juan Sunset" (Eumir Deodato) – 5:37
"Rainbow" (Don Grusin) – 5:48
"A Little Bit of This and a Little Bit of That" – 5:09
"Simplicidad" – 4:58
"Ipanema Sol" – 5:28
"It Happens Every Day" (Joe Sample) – 5:43

Personnel
 Lee Ritenour – guitar
 Ernie Watts – soprano saxophone, flute (tracks 6 & 7)
 Dave Grusin – keyboards (1, 2, 4)
 Don Grusin – keyboards (3, 5, 6, 7)
 Jeff Mironov – rhythm guitar (1, 2, 4)
 Oscar Castro-Neves – rhythm guitar (3, 5)
 Abraham Laboriel – bass (6, 7)
 Luizão Maia – bass (3, 5)
 Marcus Miller – bass (1, 2, 4)
 Alex Acuña – drums (6, 7)
 Paulinho Braga – drums (3, 5)
 Buddy Williams – drums (1, 2, 4)
 Chico Batera – percussion (3, 5)
 Jose Da Silva – percussion (3, 5)
 Armando Marçal – percussion (3, 5)
 Steve Forman – percussion (6, 7)
 Roberto Pinheiro – percussion (3, 5)
 Rubens Bassini – percussion (1, 2, 4)

1985 release listing
"Rainbow"
"San Juan Sunset"
"Rio Funk"
"It Happens Everyday"
"Ipanema Sol"
"Simplicidad"
"A Little Bit of This and a Little Bit of That"

Chart performance

References

Lee Ritenour albums
1979 albums
GRP Records albums
Elektra/Musician albums